is a Japanese manga series written and illustrated by Aki Irie. It was serialized in Harta from December 2008 to April 2015 and published in seven tankōbon volumes.

Publication
The series is written and illustrated by Aki Irie. It started serialization in Enterbrain's magazine Harta (then called Fellows!) on December 15, 2008. The series concluded on April 15, 2015. It was published in seven tankōbon volumes.

At Anime Boston 2018, Viz Media announced they licensed the series for English publication.

Volume list

Reception
Jason Thompson from Otaku USA recommended the series, praising it for its art, plot, and main protagonist. Sarah from Anime UK News also gave the first volume praise, calling it a "terrifically energetic and exuberant [start]" and the artwork "exceptional". Sean Gaffney from A Case Suitable for Treatment also gave the series praise for the art and plot. Chris Beveridge from The Fandom Post praised the artwork, while criticizing the main protagonist, calling her a "borderline brat". Anna Neatrour from Manga Report stated that despite the fact that some of the situations in the book made her uneasy, they enjoyed it and wanted to read more. As part of Anime News Network's Fall 2018 manga guide, Rebecca Silverman, Amy McNulty, Faye Hopper, and Teresa Navarro reviewed the series for the website. Each rated the series from three and a half to two and a half out of five. They all collectively praised the artwork, while finding the story a bit uncomfortable, despite enjoying it overall.

References

Further reading

External links
 

Enterbrain manga
Romance anime and manga
Seinen manga
Supernatural anime and manga
Viz Media manga